Analisa Nadine Torres (born 1959) is a United States district judge of the United States District Court for the Southern District of New York.

Early life
Analisa Torres's father, Frank Torres, served for many years as a New York Supreme Court justice in the Bronx, and as a Democratic member of the New York State Assembly; and her grandfather Felipe N. Torres (d. 1994) served as a Family Court judge and was also an assemblyman.

She received her Artium Baccalaureus degree, magna cum laude, in 1981 from Harvard College and her Juris Doctor in 1984 from Columbia Law School.

Career
Torres spent the early portion of her legal career as a real estate associate at three New York City law firms (associate at Patterson, Belknap, Webb & Tyler from 1988 to 1992; associate at Coudert Brothers from 1985 to 1987, and an associate at Kaye Scholer from 1984 to 1985). From 1992 to 1999, she clerked for Justice Elliot Wilk of the New York Supreme Court; she served as a Commissioner of the New York City Planning Commission from 1993 to 1995. From 2000 to 2002, Torres was a judge of the New York City Criminal Court. From 2003 to 2004, she was a judge on the New York City Civil Court. She served as an Acting Justice of the New York Supreme Court in the Bronx from 2004 to 2009, and became an elected Justice of that court in 2010, handling criminal felony cases, serving until 2013.

Federal judicial service 
On November 14, 2012, President Barack Obama nominated Torres to serve as a United States District Judge for the United States District Court in the Southern District of New York, to the seat vacated by Judge Naomi Reice Buchwald, who assumed senior status on March 21, 2012. On January 2, 2013, Torres's nomination was returned to the President, due to the sine die adjournment of the Senate. On January 3, 2013, she was renominated to the same office. Her nomination was reported by the Senate Judiciary Committee on February 14, 2013, by voice vote. The Senate confirmed Torres's nomination on April 18, 2013, by voice vote. She received her commission on April 23, 2013.

See also 
 List of African-American federal judges
 List of African-American jurists
 List of Hispanic/Latino American jurists

References

External links
 
 

1959 births
Living people
African-American judges
Patterson Belknap Webb & Tyler people
American women lawyers
Columbia Law School alumni
Harvard College alumni
Hispanic and Latino American judges
Judges of the United States District Court for the Southern District of New York
New York Supreme Court Justices
Lawyers from New York City
United States district court judges appointed by Barack Obama
21st-century American judges
Kaye Scholer associates
21st-century American women judges